Jenny Barazza (born July 24, 1981) is an Italian volleyball player. She was born in Codogné, Veneto.

She began to play in her native town. She scored her first success with Foppapedretti Bergamo, with which she was two times national champion (2004 and 2006), European champion (2005), won a CEV Cup (2004) and one National Cup (2006).

She earned more than 130 caps for the Italian national team, with whom she won the 2007 European Volleyball Championship, and where she also was named Best Blocker of the tournament.

Barazza competed at the 2004, 2008, and 2012 Summer Olympics.

She currently plays for Imoco Volley Conegliano.

Career

Individual awards
 2007 European Championship "Best Blocker"

References

External links

 Jenny Barazza at the Italian Women's Volleyball League
 
 
 

1981 births
Living people
Sportspeople from the Province of Treviso
Italian women's volleyball players
Italian expatriate sportspeople in Spain
Eczacıbaşı volleyball players
Olympic volleyball players of Italy
Volleyball players at the 2004 Summer Olympics
Volleyball players at the 2008 Summer Olympics
Volleyball players at the 2012 Summer Olympics
Mediterranean Games medalists in volleyball
Mediterranean Games gold medalists for Italy
Competitors at the 2009 Mediterranean Games